Dynamo Palace of Sports in Krylatskoye is a multi-purpose indoor sporting arena located in Krylatskoye District, Moscow, Russia. The arena has mainly been used to host futsal, boxing, and basketball. The seating capacity of the arena is for 5,000 people.

History
Dynamo Palace of Sports in Krylatskoye was opened in 2006. It has been used as the home arena of the Dynamo Moscow men's basketball team, and the Dynamo Moscow women's basketball. It has also been used as the home arena of Dynamo Moscow's men's futsal team.

The arena hosted the Final Four of the UEFA Futsal Cup 2007–08 season. Khimki Moscow Region also used the arena to host EuroLeague games for the EuroLeague 2015–16 season, and Krasny Oktyabr also used the arena for home games in the EuroCup competition.

References

External links

Official Site 
Dynamo Palace of Sports in Krylatskoye Photo Gallery 

Basketball venues in Russia
Boxing venues in Russia
Sports venue
Indoor arenas in Russia
Sports venues in Moscow